Joel Casamayor Johnson (born July 12, 1971) is a Cuban American former professional boxer who competed from 1996 to 2011. He held world championships in two weight classes, including the WBA super featherweight title from 2000 to 2002; and the WBC, Ring magazine and lineal lightweight titles between 2006 and 2008. As an amateur, Casamayor won a gold medal in the bantamweight division at the 1992 Olympics, after which he defected to the United States on the eve of the 1996 Olympics.

Amateur career
Casamayor's amateur record stands at 363 wins and 30 losses.
1989 – Gold medal (Bantamweight) at the Junior World Championships
1992 – Gold medal (Bantamweight) at the 1992 Summer Olympics in Barcelona, Spain
Defeated Venkatesan Devarajan (India) points
Defeated Riadh Klaai (Tunisia) points
Defeated Roberto Jalnaiz (Philippines) KO 1
Defeated Mohammed Achik (Morocco) TKO 1
Defeated Wayne McCullough (Ireland) points
1993 – Silver medal (Bantamweight) at the 1993 World Amateur Boxing Championships in Tampere, Finland
Defeated Agathangelos Tsiripidis (Greece) TKO 3
Defeated Dirk Krueger (Germany) points
Defeated Arthur Mikaelian (Armenia) points
Defeated Vladislav Antonov (Russia) points
Lost to Alexander Hristov (Bulgaria) points
1994 – Bronze medal (Featherweight) at the World Cup in Bangkok, Thailand
Defeated Brian Carr (Scotland) points
Defeated Nourredine Medjihoud (Algeria) points
Defeated Cristian Rodriguez (Argentina) points
Lost to Falk Huste (Germany) points
1994 – Silver Medal (Featherweight) at the Goodwill Games in St. Petersburg, Russia
Defeated Kai Kandelin (Finland) TKO 1
Defeated Claude Chinon (France) points
Lost to Ramaz Paliani (Russia) points
1995 – Competed (Featherweight) at the 1995 World Amateur Boxing Championships in Berlin, Germany
Lost to Raimkul Malachbekov (Russia) points

Professional career

He won the NABF Super Featherweight title in 1999 by beating Jose Luis Noyola. Later that year, he won the WBA Super Featherweight title by stopping Jong-Kwon Baek in 5 rounds. In 2002, he lost that title in a controversial unification bout with WBO champion Acelino Freitas. At one point in the fight, Casamayor slipped and the referee ruled it a knockdown. Casamayor also had a point deducted for a late hit. Many believe Casamayor should have won the fight. In 2004, Diego Corrales, whom Casamayor stopped in 2003 for the Vacant IBA super featherweight title, defeated him for the vacant WBO Super Featherweight title via a very close and controversial decision. Casamayor failed to take the WBC Lightweight title from José Luis Castillo later that year because the judges scored what seemed to be a clear win for Casamayor over Castillo. After the disputed loss to Castillo, Casamayor's career appeared to be in a downward spiral and he was set up with undefeated rising prospect Almazbek Raiymkulov in June 2005. In a close, spirited battle the bout ended in a draw, with many believing that Casamayor's best days were behind him.

After two victories against little known opposition, in October 2006, Casamayor yet again took on the popular Diego Corrales, and defeated him by split decision, winning the WBC Lightweight title and recognition as the world lightweight champion by Ring Magazine. He was stripped of the WBC title for signing to fight then WBO lightweight champion Freitas rather than defend against his mandatory challenger, WBC interim champion David Díaz. Although the fight with Freitas never took place, David Díaz was still named WBC champion and Freitas went on to fight WBA champion Juan Díaz, losing via a 9th-round TKO.

After Casamayor threatened the WBC with legal action, he was named as their interim champ. He defended the interim championship as well as The Ring's title against Jose Armando Santa Cruz on November 11, 2007 and won a controversial split decision.

The WBC removed Casamayor's interim title when, instead of fighting a rematch with Santa Cruz, he signed to fight undefeated Michael Katsidis, the WBO interim lightweight titlist. On March 22, 2008, in a great battle, Casamayor became the first man to defeat the Australian Katsidis when he won the fight with a TKO in the 10th round. With the win, Casamayor retained his Ring Magazine world title and added the WBO interim championship to his collection.

Casamayor vs. Marquez

Casamayor was defeated by Juan Manuel Márquez on September 13, 2008. Marquez (49-4-1, 36 KOs) by Knockout in the 11th round at the MGM Grand Garden Arena, Paradise. In the first four rounds of the bout, Marquez continually walked into counter lefts from Casamayor. It took Marquez until the fifth round to be able to find the range with his right hand. By the fifth round, a cut over Casamayor's right eye was opened from a clash of heads. Rounds five, six, seven and eight were rounds where Marquez landed straight punches from the outside, but he was also nailed by Casamayor whenever he lunged forward. Two minutes into the eleventh round, Casamayor was knocked down by a right hand as he pulled away from an intense exchange. Casamayor got up and immediately tried to smother Marquez, but Marquez let his hands go in furious combination. Casamayor swung back, but he went down again with about 7 seconds left in the round. Referee Tony Weeks stepped in and stopped the fight before Casamayor had a chance to stand up again. This caused some anger from fans, however, Casamayor was gracious in defeat and said, "Marquez was the best this night." The official judges had the fight scored 95-95, 95-95, and 97-93 for Marquez.

Casamayor is a unionized boxer, a member of the Joint Association of Boxers.

Comeback
On November 6, 2009, Casamayor beat Jason Davis by unanimous decision.

Casamayor fought Mexican American Robert Guerrero at the Mandalay Bay in Las Vegas, on July 31, 2010. The 10 round bout was an undercard of the Juan Manuel Márquez vs. Juan Díaz II event. The 39-year-old pugilist lost the match by unanimous decision: 98–89, 98–89, 97–90. Guerrero rocked Casamayor throughout the fight, sending him down in the second round. The Cuban got up and looked exhausted after two rounds. He recovered in the next rounds but Guerrero continued to put pressure, landing several combinations and outboxing him. In the last minute of the final round, the Cuban engaged on the offensive, with Guerrero being knocked down for the first time in his professional career.

Professional boxing record

References

External links


World Boxing Association champions
World Boxing Council champions
Olympic boxers of Cuba
Boxers at the 1992 Summer Olympics
Olympic gold medalists for Cuba
1971 births
Living people
Sportspeople from Guantánamo
Olympic medalists in boxing
Cuban male boxers
AIBA World Boxing Championships medalists
Medalists at the 1992 Summer Olympics
The Ring (magazine) champions
Light-welterweight boxers
World super-featherweight boxing champions
World lightweight boxing champions
Competitors at the 1990 Central American and Caribbean Games
Central American and Caribbean Games bronze medalists for Cuba
Defecting sportspeople of Cuba
Central American and Caribbean Games medalists in boxing
Competitors at the 1994 Goodwill Games